Zăpodea may refer to several places in Romania:

 Zăpodea, a village in Gălăuțaș Commune, Harghita County
 Zăpodea, a village in Sânger Commune, Mureș County